Jandaran (also Romanized as Jāndārān) is a village in Mangur-e Sharqi Rural District, Khalifan District, Mahabad County, West Azerbaijan Province, Iran. At the 2006 census, its population was 222, in 31 families.

References 

Populated places in Mahabad County